Juan Tomás Ortuño Martínez (born 11 February 1992), commonly known as Juanto, is a Spanish footballer who plays as a forward for CD Eldense.

Club career
Born in Yecla, Region of Murcia, Juanto joined Villarreal CF in 2011 following a brief period with Albacete Balompié, being initially assigned to the C team. On 21 January 2012 he made his Segunda División debut, starting for the reserves in a 1–0 away loss against Deportivo de La Coruña.

Juanto scored his first goal as a professional on 3 March 2012, playing 28 minutes of the 4–3 home win over CD Alcoyano. He contributed 16 games during the season, as both the first and the second teams dropped down a level.

Over the next two campaigns, Juanto scored 31 goals in 68 division three games, including all four of his team's efforts on 13 January 2013 in a defeat of CF Reus Deportiu, and a hat-trick on 17 February against UE Llagostera. He had one call-up to the main squad, remaining an unused substitute in the 1–1 La Liga home draw with Elche CF on 30 March 2014.

On 17 July 2014, Juanto signed a two-year deal with Real Murcia from the second tier. However, after the club's administrative relegation, he cut ties with it and moved to CE Sabadell FC also in that tier. He scored twice during his tenure, equalising for a 1–1 draw at Real Zaragoza on 14 September and getting the only goal then being sent off in a home victory over SD Ponferradina six days later, in an eventual relegation.

On 9 April 2015, Juanto terminated his contract with the Catalans and joined UCAM Murcia CF in the third division hours later. On 14 July, he signed with second-tier side Llagostera; in the following transfer window, however, he was released, and moved to Portugal after agreeing to a one-and-a-half-year deal with C.F. Os Belenenses. He made his Primeira Liga debut on 24 January, replacing Rafael Amorim at half-time and scoring in a 3–3 draw against Vitória S.C. at the Estádio do Restelo.

Juanto joined SD Ponferradina on 9 August 2016, after cutting ties with Belenenses. On 4 January 2017 he left by mutual consent, and returned to his previous club the following day.

Personal life
Juanto's older brother, Alfredo, was also a footballer and a forward. He too was brought up at Albacete.

References

External links

1992 births
Living people
People from Yecla
Spanish footballers
Footballers from the Region of Murcia
Association football forwards
Segunda División players
Segunda División B players
Tercera División players
Primera Federación players
Atlético Albacete players
Villarreal CF C players
Villarreal CF B players
Real Murcia players
CE Sabadell FC footballers
UCAM Murcia CF players
UE Costa Brava players
SD Ponferradina players
Lleida Esportiu footballers
Córdoba CF players
CD Castellón footballers
CD Eldense footballers
Primeira Liga players
C.F. Os Belenenses players
Spanish expatriate footballers
Expatriate footballers in Portugal
Spanish expatriate sportspeople in Portugal